Perfect Pass is a digital precision speed controls system used to control boat speed, most commonly used on high performance water ski and wakeboard boats. It is commonly compared to Cruise control systems in cars.

A Perfect Pass system has been used in breaking and setting every water ski World Record.

Design
Perfect Pass is a closed loop speed control system that maintains speed by using input settings to control many external variables such as crew and rider weight, wind adjustment, and revolutions per minute.  The output of which controls a servo motor which takes over control of the throttle when engaged.

Competitors
Perfect Pass has had few competitors in the high performance speed control market from 1995 to 2007; Accu-Ski provided a competitive product but did not successfully gain any significant market share through the late 1990s and early 2000s. Zero Off  introduced a GPS satellite technology in the mid 2000s.

Zero Off and Perfect Pass each controlled patents on the technology utilized in their products which resulted in an agreement in May 2008 in which Perfect Pass agreed to not provide units for drive-by-wire boats newer than 2008 model year and that Zero Off in turn would not provide speed control units for boats with mechanically operated throttle units.

Sources

Water sports equipment
Towed water sports
Sporting goods brands